Wesley Parish Hunt (born November 13, 1981) is an American politician and veteran serving as the U.S. representative for Texas's 38th congressional district since 2023.

Early life and education 
Hunt was born and raised in Houston to a military family. After graduating from St. John's School, he attended the United States Military Academy, where he received a Bachelor of Science in leadership and management with mechanical engineering in 2004. His West Point class of 2004 classmates include U.S. representatives John James and Pat Ryan. Hunt flew Apache helicopters in the military. 

After being honorably discharged, he attended Cornell University and obtained a Master of Business Administration, Master of Public Administration, and a Master of Industrial and Labor Relations.

U.S. House of Representatives

Elections

2020 

Hunt ran for Texas's 7th congressional district in the 2020 elections. In a field of six candidates, Hunt won the Republican primary election with 61% of the vote. He lost the general election to incumbent Democrat Lizzie Fletcher. Hunt conceded to Fletcher a day after the election.

2022 

A day after redistricted maps were revealed, Hunt announced his intention to run in the new, solidly Republican 38th district. Andrew Schneider of Houston Public Media wrote that "state GOP lawmakers carved out a new district, Texas' 38th, specifically with [Hunt] in mind." Hunt faced nine opponents in the primary election and received over 55% of the vote. He was endorsed by Republican Main Street Partnership PAC He defeated the Democratic nominee, Duncan Klussmann, in the November 8 general election, 63% to 35%.

Tenure 
In January 2023, at the beginning of the 118th U.S. Congress, Hunt supported Kevin McCarthy for Speaker of the United States House of Representatives. Hunt is on the House Judiciary, Natural Resources and Small Business Committees. On the Small Business Committee he chairs the Rural Development, Energy, and Supply Chains Subcommittee.

Hunt has endorsed Donald Trump's campaign in the 2024 presidential election.

Syria 
In 2023, Hunt was among 47 Republicans to vote in favor of H.Con.Res. 21, which directed President Joe Biden to remove U.S. troops from Syria within 180 days.

Personal life 
Around the time of his arrival in Congress, Hunt's wife, Emily, gave birth to a son, Willie, who was born prematurely and needed time in the neonatal intensive care unit, forcing Hunt to leave the 2023 Speaker of the House election on the fourth day, missing the 12th and 13th ballots and returning the same day.

Hunt is a Baptist. He attended Champion Forest Baptist Church, which he has said shaped his beliefs.

Electoral history

2020

2022

References

External links
 Congressman Wesley Hunt official U.S. House website
 Wesley Hunt for Congress campaign website
 
 

|-

1981 births
African-American Christians
African-American members of the United States House of Representatives
African-American military personnel
African-American people in Texas politics
Baptists from Texas
Black conservatism in the United States
Cornell University alumni
Living people
Politicians from Houston
St. John's School (Texas) alumni
Republican Party members of the United States House of Representatives from Texas
United States Military Academy alumni